The XII Conference of Heads of State and Government of the CPLP, commonly known as the 7th CPLP Summit (VII Cimeira da CPLP) was the 7th biennial meeting of heads of state and heads of government of the Community of Portuguese Language Countries, held on the Ilha do Sal, in Cabo Verde, on 17–18 July 2018.

Outcome
The summit elected Ambassador Francisco Ribeiro Telles of Portugal to serve as CPLP Executive Secretary.

References

External links
Official site 

CPLP Summits